The Tianshengqiao-II Dam (locally abbreviated as TSQ-II) is a dam and hydroelectric power station on the Nanpan River in the Anlong and Longlin districts in China. Construction of the dam and power plant began in 1982 and was complete in 1997.

See also 

 List of conventional hydroelectric power stations
 List of power stations in China

References

Dams completed in 1997
Dams in China
Concrete-face rock-fill dams